A drug dealer is a person involved in illegal drug dealing.

Drug Dealer may also refer to:

 "Drug Dealer" (Macklemore song), featuring Ariana DeBoo, 2016
 "Drug Dealer", a song by Machine Gun Kelly featuring Lil Wayne from the 2022 album Mainstream Sellout
 "Drug Dealer", a song by Texas Hippie Coalition from the 2008 album Pride of Texas

See also